Friday Night Lights is the soundtrack for the 2004 film Friday Night Lights, mostly written by post-rock band Explosions in the Sky in June and August 2004. It also features music by Daniel Lanois, Bad Company, and David Torn.

Explosions in the Sky joined the project after receiving an email from producer Brian Reitzell that said "he was working on a new movie and he was wondering if [the band] would be interested in doing music for it." The members were familiar with the book on which the movie was based, and were raised in its setting of West Texas. Despite having access to "all sorts of rare equipment", the band stuck to its usual songwriting style. The prominent track "Your Hand in Mine" was adapted from the 2003 album The Earth Is Not a Cold Dead Place.

Of the songs from the film, "Your Hand In Mine," "Inside It All Feels the Same," "The Sky Above, the Field Below," "To West Texas," "A Slow Dance," "From West Texas," "An Ugly Fact of Life," and "Home" have all featured on the subsequent television show.

A double vinyl version of the album was released exclusively through Hip-O Select records and was limited to only 2500 copies.

Track listing

 "From West Texas" - 2:41 
 "Your Hand in Mine (w/Strings)" - 4:08
 "Our Last Days as Children" - 2:41
 "An Ugly Fact of Life" - 2:55
 "Home" - 2:38
 "Sonho Dourado" (Daniel Lanois) - 3:26
 "To West Texas" - 4:06
 "Your Hand in Mine (Goodbye)" - 2:05
 "Inside It All Feels the Same" - 4:23
 "Do You Ever Feel Cursed" (David Torn) - 3:23
 "Lonely Train" - 6:51
 "Seagull" (Bad Company) - 4:03
 "The Sky Above, the Field Below" - 5:40
 "A Slow Dance" - 3:53

References

External links
 Explosions in the Sky albums

Explosions in the Sky albums
Drama film soundtracks
Albums produced by Brian Reitzell
2004 soundtrack albums
Sports film soundtracks